EMQ may refer to:
 Emergency Management Queensland, Australia; defunct
 Ethoxyquin, a preservative
 Extended matching questions